Maar Shurin (also spelled Maarshurin) is a village in northwestern Syria, administratively part of the Maarrat al-Nu'man District of the Idlib Governorate. According to the Syria Central Bureau of Statistics, Maar Shurin had a population of 7,487 in the 2004 census. Its inhabitants are predominantly Sunni Muslims. Nearby localities include Maarrat al-Nu'man to the west, Babila to the north, al-Ghadqah to the east, and Maar Shamshah and Talmenes to the south.

References

Populated places in Maarat al-Numan District